Das Sprachenatelier Berlin - Institute for languages, art and culture was founded as both a language school and a studio, a place where intercultural encounters and creative exchange are combined in the context of language learning.

In addition to German language courses and courses in more than forty foreign languages, festivals, film evenings, readings, concerts, exhibitions, workshops, political discussions and seminars are also organised. The institute offers sufficient space for artists and creatives to organise events and reach a broad audience. Numerous performances, plays, film showings, dance and theatre workshops as well as all forms of exhibitions have taken place at the Sprachenatelier in the past.

Sprachenatelier's spaces are regularly used for political information and discussion forums with experts from many countries. Additionally, every year - besides the regular various language courses, there is always a broad offer of cultural events all students of the Sprachenatelier can join.

Building 
 Oskar Garbe, a master mason from Lichtenberg, Berlin, was a successful property developer around 1900. In Berlin  he built the Erlöserkirche in Berlin (Church of the Redeemer)  and the Samariterkirche (Samariter Church), various commercial buildings, a cabaret theatre and several luxury villas. In 1907 he built a prestigious residential building at 40 Frankfurter Allee, which is where the Sprachenatelier can be found today. The architect Hans Liepe developed the building's plans in 1906 for Mr Garbe, who himself designed the layout of the apartments and then lived on the second floor in a nine room apartment. 
 The five-storey, red stucco-fronted building has a double-arched gable and a four sided central bay on the second and third floors with balcony. In the courtyard there is a five-storey, white klinkered industrial building with a further courtyard. The frontal facade was designed in an art nouveau style and is decorated with blue bricks. Users of the building until 1900 were principally furniture makers and shops. The complex is listed. Of particular interest are the rich, almost completely retained interior fittings in art nouveau  style.

Recognition
 Sprachenatelier Berlin is officially recognised by the Berlin Senate, CSN Sweden National Board of Student Aid (Sweden),  ANSA Norway Allianz Norwegischer Studenten im Ausland and EBACO in the Netherlands. It is a member of fadaf  and also licensed test centre for all telc exams, for CnaVT , TCF Test de connaissance du français  and Swedex.

Summer program
Every summer from June until the end of August, the Sprachenatelier Berlin offers numerous cultural programs for its students every week. While the language learners can choose between five different excursions and activities every day (from Monday until Friday) there are also weekend trips to famous German cities such as Potsdam, Dresden, Leipzig and many more. The normal "Sommerkulturprogramm" includes sightseeing through Berlin; visiting numerous exhibitions of all kinds as well as restaurants, bars and streetfood markets; going to open air cinemas; doing activities such as mini golf, playing volleyball or other sports as well as having barbecue together. An annual highlight of the summer program is the great Night of Talents.

Further Projects and events
The World is not my Village, an open forum for the discussion of themes such as globalisation, migration and environment, with a focus on people and their realm of experience.

Kulturmittwoch is weekly, extracurricular cultural programme. Museum visits, neighbourhood walks, lectures or film showings offer an insight into German culture as well as the chance to put German language skills into practice and make new contacts.

Other events

Other important events:

Languages
At Sprachenatelier Berlin the following languages are taught both in group courses and individual tuition: Albanian, Arabic, Armenian, Bengali, Bulgarian, Catalan, Chinese Danish, German, English, Estonian, Finnish, French, Greek, Georgian, Hebrew, Hindi, Italian, Irish, Icelandic, Japanese, Kiswahili, Korean, Kurdish, Latin, Latvian, Lithuanian, Mongolian, Nepalese, Dutch, Norwegian, Persian, Polish, Romanian, Portuguese, Russian, Slovak, Swedish, Slovenian, Spanish, Serbian / Croatian / Bosnian, Thai, Czech, Turkish, Ukrainian, Hungarian, and Urdu.

References

External links 
 Das Sprachenatelier homepage
 PT-Magazin - in German language - article about Sprachenatelier Berlin
 RBB Bericht - in German language - tv show about Sprachenatelier Berlin
 Tagesspiegel - in German language - article about Sprachenatelier Berlin
 Deutsche Welle - in German language - German for creative people
 Der Freitag - in German language - article Migration – oder wie sagt man auf Deutsch?

Education in Germany